Théodore Lack (3 September 1846 – 25 November 1921) was a French pianist and composer.

Life
Born in Quimper, he studied under Antoine François Marmontel (pianoforte), Lefébure-Wély (composition) and François Bazin (harmony). He started teaching piano in Paris in 1863 and achieved acclaim as a piano pedagogue.

A very precocious boy, he was appointed organist in his native town at the age of 10 and held this post until he entered the Paris Conservatory in 1860. He graduated in 1864 as winner of many prizes.

The same year he was appointed teacher of pianoforte at the Conservatory. He published a piano method, for which he won Claude Debussy to contribute a piece, The Little Nigar. He never left Paris after his admission to the Conservatory. From 1875 to 1905 he was a member of the committee on admission and of the jury of examinations. In 1881 he became an "Officier de l'Académie". He was known as representing "the finest of salon music".

He died in Paris.

Selected works

Piano music
Tarentelle, Op. 20
Boléro, Op. 27
Études élégantes, Op. 30
Valse espagnole, Op. 40
Scènes enfantines, Op. 61
Études de Mlle. Didi, Op. 85
Souvenir d'Alsace, Op. 106
Polonaise de concert
Sonatina in F Major op. 257, no 2 lV: Finale

Method
 Méthode de Piano, Op. 269, for piano 4-hands

References

External links
 

1846 births
1921 deaths
19th-century classical composers
19th-century French composers
Composers for piano
19th-century French male classical pianists
French classical composers
French male classical composers
French male composers
Pupils of Antoine François Marmontel